Inspector George Gently (also known as George Gently for the pilot and first series) is a British television crime drama series produced by Company Pictures for BBC One, set in the 1960s and loosely based on some of the Inspector Gently novels written by Alan Hunter. The series features Martin Shaw as the eponymous Inspector, Lee Ingleby as Detective Sergeant John Bacchus, and Simon Hubbard and Lisa McGrillis in supporting roles as police constables for the fictitious North East Police Constabulary.

The series is notable for moving the setting of the stories to North East England, centering on Newcastle upon Tyne, Northumberland and County Durham, as opposed to the Norfolk, as portrayed in the books. As the series begins, the death penalty is still in effect in Britain, and is used as a plot feature in some early episodes. The abolition of the penalty in 1965 is a change that is noted in the series. The earliest episodes are set in 1964, and the series progresses in approximately real time, with the closing scenes of the eighth series taking place in 1970.

Series 1 (2007)

Series 1 (2008)

Series 2 (2009) 

The show's title is changed to 'Inspector' George Gently.

Series 3 (2010)

Series 4 (2011)

The show's theme song and opening credits sequence no longer appear starting with this series.

Series 5 (2012)

Series 6 (2014)

Series 7 (2015)

Series 8 (2017)

Filming for the eighth series began in January 2017. It was subsequently confirmed that this would be the final series, and it would comprise two feature-length episodes, set in 1970, that have been written as a way to "close" the series. Company Pictures CEO Michele Buck commented: "We felt the character was coming to natural end, and wanted to bring the audience an ambitious and exciting conclusion to such a well-loved show."

DVD
Region 2 "George Gently: Series 1" DVD Released 25 May 2009, EAN: 5036193096297 PAL Format Region 0 in the UK, distributed by Acorn Media UK.
Region 2 "Inspector George Gently: Series 2" DVD Released 24 May 2010, EAN: 5036193097874 PAL Format Region 0 in the UK, distributed by Acorn Media UK.
Region 2 "Inspector George Gently: Complete Series 1 & 2" DVD Released 4 October 2010, EAN: 5036193099915 PAL Format Region 0 in the UK, distributed by Acorn Media UK.
Region 2 "Inspector George Gently: Complete Series 1–6 " DVD Released 4 August 2014, PAL Format Region 0 in the UK, distributed by Acorn Media UK.
Region 2 "George Gently – Der Unbestechliche, Volume 1" DVD Released 19-June-2009, EAN: 4029758960882 PAL Format in Germany, distributed by edel distribution.
Region 2 "George Gently – Der Unbestechliche, Volume 2" DVD Released 20 May 2011, EAN: 4029759044284 PAL Format in Germany, distributed by edel distribution.
Region 2 "George Gently – Der Unbestechliche, Volume 3" DVD Released 10-June-2011, EAN: 4029759067931 PAL Format in Germany, distributed by edel distribution.
Region 1 "George Gently: Series 1" DVD Released 11 November 2008, ASIN: B001B43IUS NTSC Format in the USA, distributed by Acorn Media US.
Region 1 "George Gently: Series 2" DVD Released 25 May 2010, ASIN: B00331RHCM NTSC Format in the USA, distributed by Acorn Media US.
Region 1 "George Gently: Series 3" DVD Released 28 June 2011, ASIN: B004SI5VUY NTSC Format in the USA, distributed by Acorn Media US.
Region 1 "George Gently: Series 4" DVD Released 3 July 2012, ASIN: B007S0DEB2 NTSC Format in the USA, distributed by Acorn Media US.
Region 1 "George Gently: Series 5" DVD Released 28 May 2013, ASIN: B009DS3VQA NTSC Format in the USA, distributed by Acorn Media US.
Region 1 "George Gently: Series 6" DVD Released 1 April 2014, ASIN: B00GWXI1F0 NTSC Format in the USA, distributed by Acorn Media US.
Region 1 "George Gently: Series 7" DVD Released 29 September 2015, ASIN: B00XDBMB8W NTSC Format in the USA, distributed by Acorn Media US.
Region 4 "George Gently: Series 1" DVD Released 17 September 2009, EAN: 9397910797498 PAL Format in Australia, distributed by REEL DVD Australia.
Region 4 "George Gently: Series 2" DVD Released 4 March 2010, EAN: 9397911012293 PAL Format in Australia, distributed by REEL DVD Australia.
Region 4 "George Gently: Series 1 & 2" DVD Released 5 May 2011, EAN: 9397911120899 PAL Format in Australia, distributed by REEL DVD Australia.
Region 4 "George Gently: Series 3" DVD Released 7 July 2011, EAN: 9397911102291 PAL Format in Australia, distributed by REEL DVD Australia.
Region 4 "George Gently: Series 4" DVD Released 1 May 2013, EAN: 9397911234497 PAL Format in Australia, distributed by REEL DVD Australia.
Region 4 "George Gently: Series 5" DVD Released 1 May 2013, EAN: 9397911246995 PAL Format in Australia, distributed by REEL DVD Australia.

References and notes

Lists of British crime television series episodes
Lists of British drama television series episodes